The Lenox Street Boys also known as the "Lenox Street Cardinals" are one of the oldest and most dangerous street gangs in Boston, Massachusetts. The gang originated in the Lenox Street Projects in the Tremont section of Roxbury, Boston. The gang has been visible on Boston Police's radar since the mid 1980s as they terrorized local stores and civilians. They were also among the only gang to feud with New York based drug gangs associated with drug lord Darryl Whiting. 

August 16, 1991 three members of the Lenox Street Boys gunned down a well known Columbia Point Dawg in Ramsey Park with other members. After a brief shootout with Columbia Point Dawgs all three LSB member ran off. The shooting lead to several other retaliated shooting in which two other Columbia Point Dawgs being shot.

2011 Raid

Boston Police made a slew of arrests in 2011 after raiding the Lenox Street housing project, picking up 21 alleged drug dealers as part of a special operation targeting drugs and gun violence in the area. 18 men had been indicted on drug charges.

2016 raid

Federal and state law enforcement officials raided the Lenox Street Projects arresting twenty-seven people, many of them allegedly connected to the Lenox Street Cardinals street gang in the Lenox Street Housing development. Nineteen were charged with distribution and possession of drugs and firearms while eight were hit with state-level drug distribution charges. Ten of the 19 have been arrested and charged.

References

Gangs in Massachusetts
African-American gangs